António Carlos Carvalho Nogueira Leitão OIH (22 July 1960 – 18 March 2012) was a Portuguese athlete who mainly competed in the long distance events.

Career
Born in Espinho, Leitão competed for Portugal at the 1984 Summer Olympics held in Los Angeles, United States, where he won the bronze medal in the men's 5.000 metres event. Following this result, he was viewed as one of the most promising athletes in his specialty; however, several injuries prevented him from participating in any further Olympic Games. He also competed for Portuguese club Benfica.

Death
Leitão died in Porto from complications due to hemochromatosis. Following his death, the Corrida António Leitão was created, which is an annual athletics competition in Lisbon organized by Benfica.

Orders
 Officer of the Order of Prince Henry

References

External links
 

1960 births
2012 deaths
People from Espinho, Portugal
Portuguese male long-distance runners
Olympic bronze medalists for Portugal
Athletes (track and field) at the 1984 Summer Olympics
Olympic athletes of Portugal
S.L. Benfica athletes
Medalists at the 1984 Summer Olympics
Olympic bronze medalists in athletics (track and field)
Sportspeople from Aveiro District